The Auster D.4 was a two-seat British light aircraft, a development of the Auster Arrow with a horizontally opposed Lycoming engine, which originated from a Portuguese Air Force requirement for a liaison/training aircraft. Six were built by Auster Aircraft at their Rearsby, Leicestershire, factory, of which five went to Portugal, and nine more were built under licence in Portugal by the Oficinas Gerais de Matereal Aeronautico OGMA from sets of components built by Auster and shipped from Rearsby. The original contract was for 25 sets of components but this was reduced in favour of the same number of additional Auster D5/160 sets.

Operational history
Most D4 aircraft were operated in Portugal by government sponsored groups. One example is still active (2018) owned by a UK-based private pilot owner.

Operators

Portuguese Air Force

Specifications

References

 
 

Single-engined tractor aircraft
1960s British civil utility aircraft
Auster aircraft
High-wing aircraft
Aircraft first flown in 1960